Pey Qaleh (also Romanized as Pey Qal‘eh; also known as Pā Qal‘eh) is a village in Haq Rural District, Nalus District, Oshnavieh County, West Azerbaijan Province, Iran. At the 2006 census, its population was 120, in 28 families.

References 

Populated places in Oshnavieh County